Stenolechia gemmella (black-dotted groundling) is a moth of the family Gelechiidae. It is known from most of Europe

The wingspan is 10–11 mm. The head is white. Forewings are whitish, somewhat sprinkled with brownish; a spot on costa near base and another at 1/3, an inwardly oblique fascia beyond middle, somewhat interrupted near costa, a spot on base of dorsum, and another at tornus black; some black scales towards apex; vein 4 absent. Hindwings are light grey. The larva is whitish; spots pale grey; head and plate of 2 yellow-brown, latter grey-speckled.

Adults are on wing from July to September, and is known for its habit of resting in crevices in bark.

The larvae feed on Quercus species. They feed in the young shoots. They cause withered leaves and occasionally swellings. Pupation normally takes place in the shoot, but occasionally outside.

References

Moths described in 1758
Taxa named by Carl Linnaeus
Stenolechia
Moths of Europe
Insects of Turkey